The 2016–17 Slovak First Football League (known as the Slovak Fortuna Liga for sponsorship reasons) was the 24th season of first-tier football league in Slovakia, since its establishment in 1993. AS Trenčín were the defending champions, after winning their 2nd Slovak championship in the previous season. The fixtures were announced on 5 July 2016. The season began on 16 July 2016 and finished on 27 May 2017.

Teams
A total of 12 teams competed in the league, including 11 sides from the 2015–16 season and one that was promoted from the 2. liga.

Relegation for MFK Skalica to the 2016–17 DOXXbet liga was confirmed on 21 May 2016. The relegated team was replaced by DOXXbet liga champion 1. FC Tatran Prešov.

2016–17 Teams

 AS Trenčín
 ŠK Slovan Bratislava
 Spartak Myjava
 FC Spartak Trnava
 MŠK Žilina
 MFK Ružomberok
 FC DAC 1904 Dunajská Streda
 ŽP Šport Podbrezová
 FC ViOn Zlaté Moravce
 FK Senica
 MFK Zemplín Michalovce
 1. FC Tatran Prešov

Stadiums and locations

1Some matches were played at NTC Senec in Senec while DAC Aréna was under renovation. 
2Some matches are played at NTC Poprad in Poprad while Tatran Stadium is under renovation. 
3Some matches were played at NTC Poprad in Poprad while Mestský futbalový štadión is under renovation. 
4Some matches are played at Štadión pod Dubňom in Žilina while Mestský futbalový štadión is under renovation.

Personnel and kits

Managerial changes

League table

Results

First and second round

Third round

Season statistics

Top goalscorers
Updated through matches played on 27 May 2017.

Hat-tricks

Clean sheets

Updated through matches played on 27 May 2017

Discipline

Player

Most yellow cards: 11
 Miroslav Petko (Tatran Prešov)
 Marin Ljubičić (DAC D.Streda)
 Erik Streňo (Tatran Prešov)

Most red cards: 1
25 players

Awards

Player of the Month

Top Eleven
Source:
Goalkeeper:  Adam Jakubech (Spartak Trnava)
Defence:  Ernest Mabouka (MŠK Žilina),  Kornel Saláta (Slovan Bratislava),  Denis Vavro (MŠK Žilina),  Jakub Holúbek (AS Trenčín/MŠK Žilina)
Midfield:  Michal Škvarka (MŠK Žilina),  Marin Ljubičić (D.Streda),   Nikolas Špalek (MŠK Žilina),  Seydouba Soumah (Slovan Bratislava),  Filip Hlohovský (MŠK Žilina)
Attack:  Jakub Mareš (MFK Ružomberok)

Individual Awards

Manager of the season

Adrián Guľa (MŠK Žilina)

Player of the Year

Filip Hlohovský (MŠK Žilina)

Young player of the Year

Pavol Šafranko (Podbrezová/D.Streda)

See also
2016–17 Slovak Cup
2016–17 2. Liga (Slovakia)
 List of transfers summer 2016
 List of transfers winter 2016-17
 List of foreign players

References

External links

Slovak
2016-17
1